Duffy is an unincorporated community in Lewis County, West Virginia, United States.

The community's name honors Dr. Duffy, a local medical doctor.

References 

Unincorporated communities in West Virginia
Unincorporated communities in Lewis County, West Virginia